The Sun Will Come Up, the Seasons Will Change is the second studio album by Scottish singer-songwriter Nina Nesbitt, released on 1 February 2019 through Cooking Vinyl. The standard edition of the album was supported by eight singles. "The Moments I'm Missing" was released as the lead single in July 2017 quickly followed by "The Best You Had", "Somebody Special", "Loyal to Me", "Colder", "Is It Really Me You're Missing", "Love Letter" and "Last December". The deluxe extension featured two new singles, "Black & Blue" and "Toxic". Nesbitt embarked on a headline tour of North America and the United Kingdom from February to April 2019 in support of the album, which visited 26 venues.

Background
The album had been worked on by Nesbitt for three years and is more pop-focused than her previous material. Nesbitt stated that it is "the album I always wanted to make on my own terms. It's an honest account of somebody in their early '20s, giving a real window into their often ever changing life."

Music
"The Best You Had" has been called "R&B-tinged" and an "unusually honest breakup track", while "The Moments I'm Missing", produced in Nesbitt's bedroom, was called "multi-layered" with a story behind it. "Somebody Special" was noted as a "love song with a twist" and a "self-love anthem", and "Is It Really Me You're Missing?" was originally intended for Rihanna.

Track listing
Adapted from iTunes.

Charts

References

2019 albums
Nina Nesbitt albums
Cooking Vinyl albums
Albums produced by Fraser T. Smith
Albums produced by Jordan Riley